Stramshall is a  village within the civil parish of Uttoxeter Rural in the county of Staffordshire, England. The village is 2.1 miles north of the town of Uttoxeter, 16.3 miles north east of Stafford and 143 miles north west of London. The village lies 0.8 miles north of the A50  that links Warrington to Leicester. The nearest railway station is at Uttoxeter for the Crewe to Derby line. The nearest airport is East Midlands Airport.

History
Stramshall has an entry in the Domesday Book of 1086. In the great book Stramshall is recorded by the name Stagrigesholle. The manor was owned by the King. The main tenant was Alric who had owned the manor before the Norman Conquest.

Parish Council
Stramshall falls within the civil parish known as Uttoxeter Rural. The council meets once a month and they hold their meetings in the village halls of both Stramshall and the nearby village of Bramshall which they use alternately each month. The village hall in Stramshall was built in 1979 and is located in Vicarage Drive.

Parish Church of Saint Michael and All Saints
The parish church was built between 1850 and 1852 and was made a separate ecclesiastic parish in 1853.

Stramshall Football Club
Stramshall Football Club is an amateur club based in the Staffordshire area. It was founded in 2005 to raise funds to refurbish the local playing field. Their kit consists of a yellow shirt with black sleeves, black Shorts and white socks. The team hold a Lads v Dads charity football game annually to help with this cause.

See also
Listed buildings in Uttoxeter Rural

References

Borough of East Staffordshire
Villages in Staffordshire
Towns and villages of the Peak District